Ray of Light is the fourth studio album by Tina Guo. It was released on March 14, 2014. Guo wrote the song "Ray of Light" within this album for Ray Armando Morabito, back in 2013.

Track listing

Letter to You 2:33
 A Love Story 2:35
 Midnight Sun 2:00
 Could It Be 4:16
 Goodnight 0:59
 Fantasies 1:16
 Forest Dreams 0:53
 January in Italy 2:34
 Love Conquers All 2:43
 Prelude Fantasies for Electric Cello 2:54
 More Than Words 3:51
 Ray of Light 0:50
 Trio for Lawnmower and 2 Cellos 1:12
 Unity 3:26
 Genesis Rising 3:10

Release history

References

External links
Ray of Light
Ray of Light - Tina Guo
TINA GUO — Ray of Light

2014 albums
Tina Guo albums